Jeremiah Zagar (born 1980 or 1981) is an American filmmaker.  He has directed the feature films We the Animals (2018) and Hustle (2022).  The former was nominated for five categories at the 34th Independent Spirit Awards.  He also directed the 2008 documentary In a Dream, which is about his father Isaiah Zagar.

Personal life
Zagar was born in South Philadelphia.  His father is Isaiah Zagar.

Filmography

References

External links
 

1980s births
Living people
People from Philadelphia
Film directors from Pennsylvania
Filmmakers from Pennsylvania
Film producers from Pennsylvania
Screenwriters from Pennsylvania
American male screenwriters
American film editors
American cinematographers
21st-century American screenwriters
Jack M. Barrack Hebrew Academy alumni